Hull Street Station was a railroad station in the city of Richmond, Virginia.  It was built by the Southern Railway to replace Mill Street Station across the river in Richmond. The station, which had been closed, was damaged in several floods of the James River before Richmond's flood wall was completed in 1995. Since 2011, it has been the site of the Richmond Railroad Museum.

Richmond Railroad Museum
The station is owned by the Old Dominion Chapter of the National Railway Historical Society (NRHS) which operates the Richmond Railroad Museum at the site.

See also
 Broad Street Station (Richmond)
 Main Street Station (Richmond)
 Transportation in Richmond, Virginia

References

External links
 Richmond Railroad Museum
Old Dominion Chapter of the National Railway Historical Society

Transportation in Richmond, Virginia
Buildings and structures in Richmond, Virginia
Railway stations in the United States opened in 1901
Railway stations in Virginia
Museums in Richmond, Virginia
Railroad museums in Virginia
Stations along Southern Railway lines in the United States
Historic district contributing properties in Virginia
National Register of Historic Places in Richmond, Virginia